
This is a list of episodes of Celebrity Juice, a British comedy panel game show that ran from 2008 to 2022 on ITV2.

Series overview

Episode list 

Bold indicates a guest captain.

Series 1 
This was the first series to feature Holly Willoughby and Fearne Cotton as team captains.

Series 2 
This was the first series to feature Rufus Hound as a regular panellist.

Series 3

Series 4

Series 5

Series 6

Series 7 
This was the last series to feature Rufus Hound as a regular panellist.

Series 8 
This was the first series to feature Chris Ramsey as a regular panellist.

Series 9 
Kelly Brook filled in as team captain this series while Fearne Cotton was absent due to being on maternity leave.

Series 10 
Fearne Cotton returned to the series and this was the last series to feature Chris Ramsey as a regular panellist.

Series 11

Series 12
Gino D'Acampo filled in as team captain this series while Holly Willoughby was absent after the first episode due to being on maternity leave.

Series 13
Holly Willoughby returned to the series and this was the first series to feature Gino D'Acampo as a regular panellist.

Series 14
Gino D'Acampo filled in as team captain this series while Fearne Cotton was absent due to being on maternity leave.

Series 15
Fearne Cotton returned to the series.

Series 16

Series 17

Series 18

Series 19
This was the last series to feature Gino D'Acampo as a regular panellist.

Series 20
This was the last series to feature Fearne Cotton as a team captain.

Series 21
This was both the only series to feature Paddy McGuinness as a team captain and Stacey Solomon as a regular panellist.

Series 22
This was the first series to feature Mel B as a team captain.

Series 23
This was the last series to feature Holly Willoughby and Mel B as team captains.

Series 24
This was the first series to feature Emily Atack and Laura Whitmore as team captains.

Series 25
This series featured Maya Jama as a regular panellist.

Series 26

Specials

Notes

References

External links 
 
 

Lists of British comedy television series episodes